Catherine Green was an Australian politician.

Catherine Green(e) may also refer to:
Catherine M. Green, English biologist
Catherine Green (Winnipeg South), New Democratic Party candidate
Catharine Littlefield Greene, wife of general Nathanael Greene
Catherine Green (equestrian) in FEI World Cup Jumping 2010/2011

See also
Katherine Green (disambiguation)
Katy Green (disambiguation)